The Diving competition in the 1970 Summer Universiade in Turin, Italy.

Medal overview

Medal table

References
 

1970 Summer Universiade
1970
1970 in diving